Bestawaripeta bus station is a bus station in Bestawaripeta of the Indian state of Andhra Pradesh. It is owned and operated by Andhra Pradesh State Road Transport Corporation. Buses from Markapur, Giddalur, Ongole, Vijayawada, Nandyal and Guntur halts here.

References

Bus stations in Andhra Pradesh
Buildings and structures in Prakasam district
Transport in Prakasam district